Castles in the Sky is a British fact-based television drama first broadcast on BBC Two on 4 September 2014. The movie shows Robert Watson-Watt and other British scientists' struggle to invent radar in the years leading to World War II.

Plot
It is the mid-1930s and Germany is making rapid advances in weaponry, especially aircraft. Suspecting that a war is likely, the British War Ministry look to new and advanced inventions of their own. This film charts the work of Robert Watson-Watt, the pioneer of Radar, and his hand-picked team of eccentric yet brilliant meteorologists as they abandon their initial direction of a death ray and struggle to turn the concept of Radar into a workable reality. Hamstrung by a small budget, challenging technical problems and even a spy, Watson Watt also has to deal with marital problems. By 1939, Watson Watt and his team have developed the world's first Radar system along England's south east coast - a system that, in 1940, will be critical in winning the Battle of Britain.

Cast
Eddie Izzard as Robert Watson-Watt
Laura Fraser as Margaret Watson-Watt
Alex Jennings as Henry Tizard
Tim McInnerny as Winston Churchill
David Hayman as Frederick Lindemann
Julian Rhind-Tutt as Albert Percival Rowe
Karl Davies as Arnold "Skip" Wilkins
Celyn Jones as "Taffy" Bowen
Iain McKee as Higgy
Joe Bone as Bell

Production
Castles in the Sky was commissioned by Janice Hadlow for BBC Two and Kim Shillinglaw, head commissioner for science and natural history. It is produced by Simon Wheeler for Hero Film and Television with Arabella Page Croft and Kieran Parker as co-producers for Black Camel Pictures. The director is Gillies MacKinnon and the writer is Ian Kershaw, who has previously worked on Shameless. Castles in the Sky is produced with Open University, BBC Two, BBC Scotland, BBC Worldwide and Creative Scotland with Glasgow Film Office, Robert Watson Watt Trust and Brechin Civic Trust.

Filming took place in various locations on Scotland's east coast; on Dunbar Beach and Hedderwick Sands in East Lothian, Newbattle Abbey and Arniston House in Midlothian, Gosford House in Longniddry, and in Edinburgh. Mark Russell composed the musical score, whilst the costume designer was Gill Horn.

Producer Wheeler said that he hoped the film would illuminate the "sex appeal" of science. He said, "The time is right for a contemporary approach to this rich and under-reported vein of British history—it's not like other war stories—if anything it's more akin to a combination of The Social Network and Chariots of Fire than The Dambusters or Reach for the Sky."

Reception
The film was previewed at the Edinburgh Film Festival in June 2014. Variety took the view that there were "many ways in which 'Castles in the Sky' adheres timidly to biopic convention...from Mark Russell’s sugary score to Gill Horn’s elegant but unworn costumes. Watson-Watt may stress the importance of 'free thinkers, rule-breakers and men without ties,' but this tweedy portrait never undoes its top button." Andrew Pulver in The Guardian said that the film "has been framed as a rousing patriotic story, with a side-order of bash-the-establishment", having the humble Scot Watson-Watt and his team pitted against snobbish upper-crust figures: "to suit the we're-all-in-this-together mood, Watson-Watt's team are carefully pan-British, with Welsh and Yorkshire scientists in there too."

After the television broadcast, writing in The Daily Telegraph, Jake Wallis Simons said of the film, "The problem was that this was a story in which nothing very dramatic happened. A moment in history, however significant, doesn’t automatically make a compelling piece of television." He added, "Izzard did his best, but neither story nor script worked in his favour.." concluding: "Overall, it all felt a bit worthy. This was history that everybody should know, but the erection of a statue might have done the job just as well."

References

External links
 

BBC television dramas
2010s British television series
Television shows set in the United Kingdom
BBC television documentaries
English-language television shows
Films shot in Edinburgh
Films shot in East Lothian
Films directed by Gillies MacKinnon